Soumitra Chatterjee or Soumitra Chattopadhyay (Shoumitro Chôttopaddhae;19 January 1935 – 15 November 2020) was an Indian film and stage actor and poet. He is best known for his collaborations with Oscar-winning film director Satyajit Ray, with whom he worked in fourteen films, and his constant comparison with the Bengali cinema screen idol Uttam Kumar, his contemporary leading man of the 1960s and 1970s. Soumitra Chatterjee is also the first Indian film personality to be conferred with the Commandeur de l’ Ordre des Arts et des Lettres, France's highest award for artists. He is also the winner of the Dadasaheb Phalke Award which is India's highest award for cinema.  In 2017 exactly thirty years after auteur Satyajit Ray was honoured with France's highest civilian award, the coveted Legion of Honor, thespian Soumitra Chatterjee, arguably, the most prominent face of Ray's films, also received the award.

Starting with his debut film, Apur Sansar (The World of Apu, 1959), the third part of Apu Trilogy, he went on to work in several notable films with Ray, including Abhijan (The Expedition, 1962), Charulata (The Lonely Wife, 1964), Aranyer Din Ratri (Days and Nights in the Forest, 1969); Ashani Sanket (Distant Thunder, 1973); Sonar Kella (The Fortress, 1974) as Feluda and Joi Baba Felunath (The Elephant God, 1978) as Feluda, Ghare Baire (The Home and The World, 1984) and Ganashatru (Enemy of the People, 1989). Meanwhile, he also worked with other noted directors of Bengali cinema, with Mrinal Sen in Akash Kusum (Up in the Clouds, 1965), Tapan Sinha in Kshudhita Pashan (Hungry Stones, 1960), Jhinder Bandi (1961), Asit Sen in Swaralipi (1961), Ajoy Kar in Saat Pake Bandha (1963), Parineeta (1969), and Tarun Mazumdar in Sansar Simante (1975) and Ganadevata (1978). He acted in more than 210 films in his career till 2016.

Hindi films

Bengali films

Bengali TV series

Television

Directorial venture 

The Bengali Night (French: la Nuit Bengali) is a 1988 semi-autobiographical film based upon the Mircea Eliade 1933 Romanian novel, Bengal Nights, directed by Nicolas Klotz and starring Hugh Grant, Soumitra Chatterjee, Supriya Pathak and Shabana Azmi.

References

External links
 Soumitra Chatterjee filmography on IMDb
 Soumitra Chatterjee poem

Indian filmographies
Male actor filmographies